WXVM (104.1 FM is a radio station located in Merrill, Wisconsin (licensed to Merrill, Wisconsin).  The station was originally titled as "Z104" broadcasting a classic rock format. On April 15, 2014, at 3PM, the station switched to "Magic 104", a Hot AC format, keeping the WMZK call sign. The stations' ratings fell quickly and badly, with many complaints of the switch (removing a well-known rock station for a format which failed earlier in the city on 96.7.) On January 12, 2015, the station switched back to Z104, again under the direction of Quicksilver, but slightly changed their format, to classic rock. The original format change to Hot AC came when Radio One Communications agreed to acquire WMZK and WJMT from Barracuda Broadcasting/Quicksilver Broadcasting for $595,000 and immediate Time Brokerage Agreement. The sale never closed.

On January 24, 2017, WMZK was sold to WRVM, Inc. and went silent in preparation for a switch to a simulcast of Christian-formatted WRVM 102.7 FM Suring. After a period of transmitter repair, on May 19, 2017, WMZK's calls were changed to WXVM and it returned to the air with a simulcast of WRVM's Christian radio format.

References

External links

Radio stations established in 1973
1973 establishments in Wisconsin
XVM
Lincoln County, Wisconsin